MicroCon is a biennial summit of micronationalist government representatives, held biennially in odd-numbered years except for 2021 (when it was delayed due to the COVID-19 pandemic). MicroCon was created by the government of Molossia as a venue for delegates of micronations around the world "to share their ideas, dreams and worlds with each other."

History

MicroCon 2015
The first MicroCon was hosted by the Republic of Molossia. It took place on April 11, 2015 at the Anaheim Central Library, Anaheim, California.    Among the attendees were King Christopher of Vikesland, Grand Duke Travis of Westarctica, Queen Carolyn of Ladonia and President Kevin Baugh of Molossia. The Kingdom of Shiloh sent a large delegation.

Other attendees included Vladimir Valentinovich Veselovsky of the Provisional Territories of the Free Autocratic Republic of Totalitarianism, who was criticized for his approach to micronationalism. 

The keynote speech was given, via pre-recorded video, by Steven F. Scharff, manager of the Microfreedom Index. Other conference presentations included "Origins of Micronationalism", "But What's the Point?: Micronations That Matter", "Alternative Technologies in the Micronational Arena / Legal Process of Micronational Documents", and micronation leaders introducing their countries' histories and plans for the future.

Attendees 

  President Kevin Baugh of the Republic of Molossia
  HRM Queen Anastasia Sophia Maria Helena of the Kingdom of Ruritania
  HRH Grand Duke Travis McHenry of Westarctica
  HRM King George 2.0 of Slabovia
  King Christopher I of Vikesland
  HM Queen Carolyn of Ladonia
  Vice-President John Farr and Foreign Minister Michael Farr of the Republic of West Who
 Vladimir Valentinovich Veselovsky of Free Autocratic Republic of Totalitarianism
 King Timothy Miller of the Kingdom of Shiloh
 His Holy Highness Yan the First of YAN 
 HM Grand Duke Jacob Felts of Broslavia
  HIM Emperor Joseph Vladimir Christ of Gilead
 His Territorial Highness Prince Arthur Louis Pagan of Homestead
 Grand Marshal Carolyn Yagjian of the Kaotic Ambulatory Free States of Obsidia
 HM King Adam I of the Kingdom of Überstadt
 Dictator Dorian Grimes of the Republic of Doria

MicroCon 2017
The 2017 MicroCon was held June 23–25, 2017 in Tucker, Georgia. It was hosted by the Kingdom of Ruritania. Delegates from 26 micronations attended. Presentation topics included "How to Sustain a Micronation", “Hobby Micronationalism In The 21st Century”, "Women in Micronations: Starting Your Own or Supporting Your Dictator Husband", and "The Mental Condition of Emperor Norton".

Attendees

  Aerican Empire
  Kingdom of Ruritania 
  Kingdom of Slabovia
  Republic of Molossia
  Grand Duchy of Westarctica
  Republic of West Who
  Grand Duchy of Flandrensis
  Principality of Aigues-Mortes
  Empire of Angyalistan
House of Homestead
Republic of St. Castin
Ambulatory Free States of Obsidia
State of Sandus
Commonwealth of Boshka
Kingdom of Jupiter and Greater Territories
Kingdom of Amethonia
Republique du Saugeais
Kingdom of Coria
Kingdom of Briarcliff
Mountain Empire of Frankland
The Star Kingdom
Republic of Incrementis 
Kingdom of Talossa

MicroCon 2019

The 2019 MicroCon was held in Hamilton, Ontario, Canada on July 19, 20, and 21, 2019. It was hosted by the Government of Slabovia.

Attendees

  Kingdom of Ruritania 
  Kingdom of Slabovia
  Republic of Molossia
  Grand Duchy of Westarctica
  Republic of West Who
  Grand Duchy of Flandrensis
  Principality of Aigues-Mortes
  Royal Republic of Ladonia
Republic of St. Castin
Ambulatory Free States of Obsidia
Kingdom of Amethonia
Kingdom of Pibocip
Kingdom of Fergus
Empire of Pavlov
Republic of Slowjamastan
Principality of Sancratosia
 Grand Emirate of Raphania
Grand Republic of Cycoldia
Technocratic Republic of Aethodia
Kingdom of North Barchant
Zaqistan

MicroCon 2022

MicroCon 2022 was held in Las Vegas, Nevada. Originally scheduled for 2021, it was delayed due to the ongoing COVID-19 pandemic to August 04-6, 2022, and was hosted by the Westarctica.

MicroCon 2023
MicroCon 2023 is scheduled for the summer of 2023. The main event will be hosted by the Royal Republic of Ladonia, it will take place June 30-July 2 in the Chicago suburb of Joliet, Illinois.
This year there is also a smaller EU event that will take place August 11-13 in Ypres, Belgium and will be co-hosted by the Royal Republic of Ladonia and Grand Duchy of Flandrensis.

Locations and dates

Micronational Hall of Excellence
The Micronational Hall of Excellence is an institution created with the goal of preserving history and recognizing the contributions of significant individuals in the field of micronationalism. These eight individuals received the Norton Award and were inducted during MicroCon 2022: Emperor Norton, Paddy Roy Bates, Kevin Baugh, Travis McHenry, Niels Vermeersch, Lars Vilks, Leonard Casley and Gabrielle Pourchet.

See also 
Micronation
List of micronations

References

External links 
 
 MicroCon 2019
 MicroCon 2022
MicroCon 2023
 MicroCon Committee website

Micronational culture
Biennial events
Recurring events established in 2015